Hypergraphic may refer to:

Suffering from the impulse disorder hypergraphia, an overwhelming urge to write.
A graphic on a web page which is also a hyperlink.